Haplochrois theae is a species of moth of the family Elachistidae. It is found from western Transcaucasia and Anatolia to China. It probably originated from Southeast Asia. During the 20th century, this species was a serious pest on tea plantations in Georgia and to a lesser degree, in the Krasnodar Territory of Russia.

The wingspan is 9–12 mm. Adults are on wing from June to August in one generation per year.

The larvae feed on Camellia sinensis and Camellia japonica and is considered a pest. They mine the leaves of their host plant. The mine has the form of a small fleck mine. Up to forty mines can be found in a single leaf. Larvae can be found from late summer to fall and again (after overwintering) in the second half of March. At this point, they feed on the young shoots. They mine in the pith. Pupation takes place from the end of May to the end of July within the mine.

References

Moths described in 1916
Elachistidae
Moths of Asia